Garuda is a 2022 Indian Kannada-language action drama film directed by Sujay K. Shrihari. The film stars Siddharth Mahesh, Srinagar Kitty, Aindrita Ray and Ashika Rangnath. The music is done by Raghu Dixit.

Cast 
Siddharth Mahesh as Ram/Vikram
Srinagara Kitty as ACP Sampath
Aindrita Ray as Anu
Ashika Rangnath as Pooja
Rajesh Natranga as Bharath Bharghav
Rangayana Raghu as Shankranna
Kamna Jetmalani
P. Ravishankar as Surya Prathap
Sujay Shastry as Raju

Plot

The story revolves around a character named Vikram (Siddharth Mahesh) who is out there to take revenge on the evil that destroyed his family and who are a threat to his country.

Soundtrack 
The soundtrack album has five singles composed by Raghu Dixit, and released on Raghu Dixit Music.

Release and reception
The film was released on 20 May 2022. A Sharadhaa from The New Indian Express wrote "Rangayana Raghu too has a significant role to play, but the highlight of Garuda is Srinagar Kitty. His character as a kadak police officer makes a strong presence. Garuda is recommended to those who love to see a mix of action-revenge, love, and family sentiments, and for those who had particularly missed Kitty’s presence on the silver screen". A critic from The Times of India scored the film at 3 out of 5 stars and says "Srinagara Kitty gives a solid performance and has a good role after a while. Aindrita Ray and Ashika Ranganath are limited, mostly to songs and a few scenes. Kamna Jethmalani, Rangayana Raghu and Ramesh Bhat have performed well. Adi Lokesh is a tad loud, but effective as the villain. The songs from Raghu Dixit fail to leave a mark. Garuda does touch upon some pertinent issues and could be a one-time watch". Pratibha Joy from OTT Play wrote "Verdict: Garuda is old wine in a new bottle as far as the revenge element of the story goes. Although there is family drama, romance, comedy and action, this one’s for those who like their staple fare of commercial cinema. If that is not your cup of tea, you may not want to invest two-and-a-half hours on this film".

References

External links 
 

Indian action drama films
2020s Kannada-language films
2022 films
Films shot in Karnataka
Indian gangster films